Roland Hedlund (17 November 1933 – 8 March 2019) was a Swedish actor. For his role in the 1969 film Ådalen 31 he won the Best Actor award at the 6th Guldbagge Awards. He appeared in more than 70 films and television shows between 1955 and 2012.

Selected filmography
 Violence (1955)
 Ådalen 31 (1969)
 A Guy and a Gal (1975)
 Rasmus på luffen (1981)
 A Hill on the Dark Side of the Moon (1983)
 Codename Coq Rouge (1989)
 The Hunters (1996)
 Beck – Kartellen (2002)

References

External links

1933 births
2019 deaths
20th-century Swedish male actors
21st-century Swedish male actors
Swedish male film actors
Swedish male television actors
People from Skellefteå Municipality
Best Actor Guldbagge Award winners